Y junction may refer to one of several things.
 A 3-way junction where three roads meet.
 A Wye (railroad) junction that takes the form of a triangle of railway lines.